Kyllikki Forssell (2 May 1925 — 7 October 2019) was a leading Finnish stage and film actress, with a career spanning over 60 years from the mid-20th to the early 21st century and film director.

She was one of the first four Finnish women film directors.

Early life and education
Kyllikki Forssell was born in Helsinki to cavalry Colonel Juho Forssell and Kyllikki  Nyman-Linnove. She had a strict, military-style upbringing, with her mother insisting — despite the family being Finnish-speaking — on speaking French to her daughter.

She received her education in Finnish, Swedish and German, completing her secondary school in 1943, and went on, against the wishes of her anti-thespian father, to study acting at the Suomi-Filmi cinematic school (1943–44) and the Swedish Theatre stage school (1944–46).

Career
Forssell was regarded as an intelligent, confident, and technically skilled actor, with a line of strong, regal characters in her repertoire.

Although she appeared in several films, she is best known as a stage actor, most notably attached to the Finnish National Theatre where she worked over 40 years from 1948 until the early 1990s. She also worked extensively with the Helsinki City Theatre.

She also directed four productions at the National Theatre, as well as three television dramas.

Stage work (selected)
A small selection of Forssell's many roles included (all at the Finnish National Theatre, unless otherwise indicated):
Jessica in Dirty Hands
Annie Sullivan in The Miracle Worker
Catharine in Suddenly Last Summer
Gwendolen Fairfax in The Importance of Being Earnest
Mary Tyrone in Long Day's Journey into Night
Miss Mary Shepherd / Margaret Fairchild in The Lady in the Van
Marquise de Merteuil in Les Liaisons Dangereuses

Her portrayal of Annie Sullivan in The Miracle Worker was considered by some as the performance of the decade.

Filmography as actress (selected)
Tyttö Astuu Elämään (1943) — Aino Mäkinen
Nuoria Ihmisiä (1943) — Leni
Suomisen Olli Yllättää (1945) — Leila
Ylijäämänainen (1951) — Ella Quist

Filmography as director
Kolmiopila (1953)
Merihevonen (1961)
Play Strindberg (1971)

Honours and awards

In 1989, the honorary title of Teatterineuvos ( 'Theatre Counselor') was conferred on Forssell by the President of Finland.

Personal life
In 1945, Forssell married the historian, Professor Patrick Bruun, but the marriage ended in divorce only five years later.

In 1951, she married Freiherr Erik Indrenius-Zalewski, thus becaming entitled Freifrau (Finnish: Vapaaherratar).

In the 1960s her affair with fellow actor Esko Salminen, 15 years her junior, caused something of a scandal due to their age difference.

Forssell retired in 2012, and died in 2019 at the age of 94, after a long battle with cancer.

References

External links

1925 births
2019 deaths
20th-century Finnish actresses
21st-century Finnish actresses
Actors from Helsinki
Pro Finlandia Medals of the Order of the Lion of Finland
Finnish film directors
Finnish women film directors